Alhóndiga is a municipality located in the province of Guadalajara, Spain. According to the 2004 census (INE), the 
municipality has a population of 244 inhabitants.

References

Municipalities in the Province of Guadalajara